The 1940 Furman Purple Hurricane football team was an American football team that represented Furman University as a member of the Southern Conference (SoCon) during the 1940 college football season. In their ninth year under head coach Dizzy McLeod, the Purple Hurricane compiled an overall record of 5–4 with a conference mark of 4–3, and finished eighth in the SoCon.

Schedule

References

Furman
Furman Paladins football seasons
Furman Purple Hurricane football